Michael McKinson (born 17 April 1994) is a British professional boxer. At regional level, he held the WBO European welterweight title from 2019 to 2020.

Mckinson is trained by his father Michael Ballingall, who also trains his younger brother Lucas Ballingall, a professional boxer in the lightweight division.

Professional boxing record

References

British male boxers
Sportspeople from Portsmouth
Welterweight boxers
1994 births
Living people